Interferon regulatory factor 2 binding protein 2 is a protein that in humans is encoded by the IRF2BP2 gene.

Function

This gene encodes an interferon regulatory factor-2 (IRF2) binding protein that interacts with the C-terminal transcriptional repression domain of IRF2. Alternative splicing results in multiple transcript variants encoding distinct isoforms.

References

Further reading